Jeffrey Allen (born 23 April 1946, Matlock, Derbyshire) is an English rock and blues session drummer.  Allen is best known for his work with East of Eden, Snowy White, Bonnie Tyler, Mick Taylor and Van Morrison. 

He is not to be confused, although in many listings often is, with the similarly named former drummer with the British glam rock outfit, Hello, whose brother is Ultravox's Chris Cross.

Biography
Allen became the drummer with the Glasgow based band, The Beatstalkers, who played residencies at the Marquee Club in London, and the Frankfurt and Cologne 'Storeyville' clubs. Allen joined East of Eden in 1971, and his percussion work appeared on five of their albums in the 1970s. In the early 1980s, working as a freelance session musician, Allen played on albums recorded by Bonnie Tyler (Goodbye to the Island), Murray Head (Voices) and John Martyn (Well Kept Secret). In 1986, Allen joined Snowy White's Blues Agency, and drummed on their 1988 album, Change My Life.

In 1995, Allen teamed up with both Mick Taylor and Snowy White for their live album, Arthur's Club-Geneve 1995. In 2003, Allen played drums on Baghdad  by Ilham al-Madfai. He also played backing Mick Taylor and Max Middleton at London's Cadogan Hall in 2012.

Most recent duties include party planning for the Brunei Royal Family in London, which led to his appointment as executive producer of music concerts for Sensible Music, London..

Partial discography
1971: New Leaf - East of Eden
1971: World of East of Eden - East of Eden
1972: First Base - Babe Ruth (played on one track)
1975: Another Eden - East of Eden
1976: It's the Climate - East of Eden
1978: Restless - Rab Noakes
1978: Silver Park - East of Eden
1981: Goodbye to the Island - Bonnie Tyler
1981: Voices - Murray Head
1982: Well Kept Secret - John Martyn
1983: Philentropy - John Martyn
1988: Change My Life - Snowy White's Blues Agency
1995: Arthur's Club-Geneve 1995 - Mick Taylor & Snowy White (live album)
2000: Burning Bush - Troy Hardin
2000: Peter Green Songbook - Peter Green
2000: A Stone's Throw - Mick Taylor
2003: Baghdad - Ilham al-Madfai
2005: Ghost Party - Jeff Arundel
2007: Utopia 2 - Belinda
2009: Twice as Addictive - Snowy White's Blues Agency

Through his drumming duties with various musicians over the years, Allen's work appears on numerous compilation albums.

References

External links
Sensible-music.co.uk

1946 births
Living people
English rock drummers
English session musicians
People from Matlock, Derbyshire